The final of the Men's 200 metres Butterfly event at the European LC Championships 1997 was held on Saturday 23 August 1997 in Seville, Spain.

Finals

Qualifying heats

Remarks

See also
1996 Men's Olympic Games 200m Butterfly
1997 Men's World Championships (SC) 200m Butterfly

References
 scmsom results
 La Gazetta Archivio
 swimrankings

B